Alioum Saidou (born 19 February 1978) is a Cameroonian former professional footballer who played as a defensive midfielder. He played international football for the Cameroon national team, with whom he played at the 2006 Africa Cup of Nations.

Career
Born in Maroua, Saidou started his career in his native Cameroon at local side Coton Sport before being spotted by scouts from İstanbulspor. He joined Galatasaray S.K., before moving to Malatyaspor in 2005.

Honours
Galatasaray
 Süper Lig: 2005–06

Kayserispor
 Turkish Cup: 2008

References

External links
 
 Guardian Stats Centre

1978 births
Living people
Association football midfielders
Cameroonian footballers
Cameroon international footballers
Cameroonian expatriate footballers
Cameroonian Muslims
People from Maroua
Ligue 1 players
Süper Lig players
İstanbulspor footballers
Galatasaray S.K. footballers
Malatyaspor footballers
FC Nantes players
Kayserispor footballers
Sivasspor footballers
Expatriate footballers in Turkey
Expatriate footballers in France
Cameroonian expatriate sportspeople in Turkey
Cameroonian expatriate sportspeople in France